List of Railway stations in Senegal include:

Maps 
 UN Map
 Go

Towns served by rail

Existing 

 Dakar - port and national capital (0 km)
 Hann - truncated terminus (3 km)
 Bargny proposed deepwater port.
 Rufisque - cement works

 Kirène - cement works to be expanded in 2008. - nearest station is Thiès about 20 km away.

 Thiès - junction for St-Louis and Linguere; workshops 
 Bambey
 Diourbel - junction for Touba, Mbaké
 Gossas
 Guinguinéo - junction for Kaolack and Lydiane
 Kaolack - provincial capital
 Lydiane - branch terminus
 Kaffrine 
 Niahène
 Koungheul
 Koumpentoum
 Koussanar 
 Tambacounda - provincial capital and proposed junction
 Bala
 Goudiry 
  Kidira - border with Mali
  Nayé, Senegal - border with Mali
  Kayes, Mali 
  Bamako, Mali - national capital - workshops

 Tivouane 
 Meckhe - 
 Grande Côte - mineral sands
 Louga - junction
 Mpal 
 St-Louis
 Thiès - junction for St-Louis
 Louga - junction
 Koki
 Daraa
 Linguere - railhead

Proposed 
 Ziguinchor

 Tambacounda - provincial capital and proposed junction
 Kédougou - proposed branch terminus 

 Dakar and Thiès
 Falémé River - iron mines  suspended 2009 

 phosphate mines at Matam (17m) 

 Transcontinental railway from Dakar to Port Sudan.

 2012
 Meckhe - junction
 Grande Côte - mineral sands Junction

 2012
 Mekhé - junction
 Diogo

Standard Gauge 

 2001 Report 
 2010 Report

See also 

 Transport in Senegal
 Railway stations in Mali
 AfricaRail - plan to interconnect several railway systems, and railless landlocked countries.
 Train Express Regional

References 

 
Railway stations
Railway stations